Power is a play by the British playwright Nick Dear. It is set in the court of King Louis XIV of France. It deals with the intrigue and tension of the court and explores the events and ideas that led Luis XIV to take full control of government and become an absolute monarch.

The play is essentially a drama, but also contains a great deal of comedy and innuendo.

Power was first performed by the Royal National Theatre at the Cottesloe Theatre on July 3, 2003, and the original cast was:

Jean-Baptiste Colbert – Stephen Boxer
Anne of Austria – Barbara Jefford
Nicolas Fouquet – Robert Lindsay
Louise de la Valliere – Hattie Morahan
Louis XIV – Rupert Penry-Jones
Philippe I, Duke of Orléans – Jonathan Slinger
Henriette d'Angleterre – Geraldine Somerville

More recently, Power was performed by the Putney Arts Theatre Company at Putney Arts Theatre in February 2006, and the Lace Market Theatre in Nottingham between 17 and 22 July 2006. Power was premiered in the Finnish National Theatre (Kansallisteatteri) 6 September 2006. It has also been produced at theatres in Portugal (Teatro Municipal de Almada), Poland and Hungary.

External links
 The Portuguese production of Power

British plays
2003 plays